Souquet may refer to:
 Arnaud Souquet (born 1992), a French football player
 Ralf Souquet (born 1968), a German professional pool player